The Fighters is the third studio album by Canadian country music artist Chad Brownlee. It was released on June 3, 2014 via MDM Recordings. The album includes the singles "Where the Party At?", "Fallin' Over You", "Just Because", and "When the Lights Go Down".

Critical reception
Shenieka Russell-Metcalf of Top Country gave the album four stars out of five, writing that "the album as a whole provides listeners with strong vocals and well-crafted tracks from start to finish."

Track listing

Chart performance

Singles

References

External links

2014 albums
Chad Brownlee albums
MDM Recordings albums